This topic covers notable events and articles related to 2015 in music.

Specific locations

Specific genres

Albums released 
List of 2015 albums

Awards

Bands formed
 3776
 1Punch
 Akishibu Project
 April
 Bastarz
 Big Brain
 Billie Idle
 Bish
 Bursters
 Camellia Factory
 CLC
 Day6
 DIA
 Earphones
 Ebisu Muscats
 Fate Gear
 GFriend
 The Hoopers
 iamnot
 Idol Renaissance
 Iginari Tohoku San
 iKon
 JJY Band
 Kolme
 La PomPon
 Ladybaby
 lol
 Magnolia Factory
 MAP6
 MeloMance
 Monsta X
 Mrs. Green Apple
 MyB
 Myth & Roid
 N.Flying
 Official Hige Dandism
 Oh My Girl
 OxT
 Pasocom Music Club
 The Peggies
 Pentagon
 Playback
 Pretty Brown
 POP
 Romeo
 Rubber Soul
 Seventeen
 Snuper
 Srv.Vinci
 Sora tob sakana
 Suchmos
 Tacoyaki Rainbow
 Tokimeki Sendenbu
 TrySail
 Twice
 Unicorn
 UP10TION
 VAV
 VIXX LR
 Wednesday Campanella
 Whiteeeen

Soloist debuts
 Aimyon
 Alina Baraz
 Alessia Cara
 Alex Gonzaga
 Amber
 Anly
 Anne-Marie
 Aurora
 Baek Yerin
 Bea Miller
 Charlie Puth
 Choa
 Daoko
 Daya
 Dean
 Declan McKenna
 Dua Lipa
 Elo
 Elsie
 Halsey
 Horan
 Faouzia
 Ferlyn G
 G2
 Gaeko
 G.Soul
 Goo Hara
 Hailee Steinfeld
 Iñigo Pascual
 Jacob Benedicto
 Jang Hyun-seung
 Jeremy Zucker
 Julien Baker
 Jung Yong-hwa
 Junoflo
 Jonghyun
 Julian Trono
 Kehlani
 Kiiara
 Lee Hongki
 Lizzy
 Mabel
 Marlo Mortel
 Matteo Guidicelli
 Morissette
 Minah
 Miwoo
 Niel
 Park Jimin
 Patrick Brasca
 Poppy
 Post Malone
 Reol
 Reese Lansangan
 Rita De Guzman
 RM
 Sakura Fujiwara
 Shaun
 Taeyeon
 Wuno
 Lee Tae-il
 Ugly Duck
 Yassi Pressman
 Yezi

Bands reformed

13th Floor Elevators
The Academy Is...
A-ha
Aiden
Alexisonfire
Armor for Sleep
At the Drive-In
Bay City Rollers
The Black Eyed Peas
Black Grape
The Bluetones
Brooks & Dunn
Busted
The Corrs
Daphne and Celeste
Dashboard Confessional
Digable Planets
Disturbed
Evanescence
Faithless
Good Charlotte
LCD Soundsystem
Lush
The Matches
Pist.On
The Promise Ring
Rainbow
Royal Trux
Savatage
Simply Red
The Starting Line
Supertramp
Symphony Number One
Thrice
A Tribe Called Quest
Underoath
Ween

Bands disbanded

3 Inches of Blood
Avi Buffalo
The Black Crowes
Bloodhound Gang
Burzum
California Breed
Cali Swag District
CBS Orchestra
Cobra Starship
Device
Eastern Conference Champions
Erase Errata
Flesh for Lulu
Framing Hanley
Funeral For a Friend
Goodbye to Gravity
G.R.L.
I, the Breather
James Last Orchestra
Kill Hannah
Klaxons
Maybeshewill
Mean Creek
MellowHype
Mötley Crüe
Motörhead
Neutral Milk Hotel
Noah and the Whale
Obits
Odd Future
The Replacements
Rise to Remain
The Rosso Sisters
Scott Weiland and the Wildabouts
Sleeper Agent
Stereo Kicks
Texas in July
The Weakerthans

Deaths

January
 1 – Matthew Cogley (30), British musician and songwriter (Failsafe).
 6 – Lance Percival (81), British actor and singer.
 13 – Ronnie Ronalde (91), British siffleur and yodeller.
 19 – Ward Swingle (87), American jazz singer (The Swingle Singers).
 22 – Joan Hinde (81), British trumpet player.
 27 – Margot Moir (55), Scottish-born Australian singer (The Moir Sisters).
 29 – Danny McCulloch (69), British bassist (Eric Burdon & The Animals).

February
12 – Steve Strange (55), British musician (Visage). 
 21 – Clark Terry (94), American jazz trumpeter.
 22 – Erik Amundsen (78), Norwegian jazz upright-bassist.
 23 – Ron Edgar (68), American rock drummer (The Music Machine)

March
 21 – Jørgen Ingmann, (89), Danish guitarist.

April
 1 – Dave Ball (65), British musician (Procol Harum).
 3 – Andrew Porter (86), British organist, music critic, and opera director
 10 – Ronald Hambleton (97), English-born Canadian broadcaster and music critic (Toronto Star).
 13 – Ronnie Carroll (80), Northern Irish singer.
 17 – Brian Couzens (86), British music industry executive (Chandos Records).

May
 6 – Dottie Dillard (91), American pop singer (The Anita Kerr Quartet)
 14 – B.B. King (89), American blues guitarist.
 20 – Bob Belden (58), American jazz saxophonist.
 23 – Marcus Belgrave (78), American jazz trumpeter.
 31 – Slim Richey (77), American jazz guitarist.

June
 11 – Ornette Coleman (85), American jazz saxophonist.
 12 – Monica Lewis (93), American singer and actress.
 21 – Gunther Schuller (89), American composer, conductor, and horn player.
 27 – Joe Bennett (75), American rock and roll singer, songwriter, and guitarist (Joe Bennett & the Sparkletones)

July
 1
Val Doonican (88), Irish-born singer.
Edward Greenfield (86), British music critic and broadcaster.
 13 – Eric Wrixon (68), British musician from Belfast, Northern Ireland (Them, Thin Lizzy).
 22
Daron Norwood (49), American country music singer
Eddie Hardin (66), British singer-songwriter and pianist (The Spencer Davis Group and Axis Point).
 31 – Pamela Brandt (68), American country-rock bassist, singer and songwriter (The Deadly Nightshade)

August
 1 – Cilla Black (72), British singer and presenter.
 12 – John Scott (59), British organist and choirmaster.
 14 – Jazz Summers (71), British music manager (Scissor Sisters, The Verve, Snow Patrol), (lung cancer)
 20 – Laurent Rossi (67), French singer, songwriter, and record producer (Bimbo Jet)

September
 4 – Hal Willis (82), Canadian country music singer
 29 – Phil Woods (83), American jazz saxophonist, clarinetist, bandleader and composer

October
 9 – Larry Rosen (75), American drummer, entrepreneur, and music producer.
 22 – Mark Murphy (83), American singer.
 28 – Diane Charlemagne (51), English dance singer (52nd Stree, Urban Cookie Collective)

November
 5 – Nora Brockstedt, Norwegian singer (92).
 25 – Svein Christiansen, Norwegian drummer (74).

December

 3 – Scott Weiland (48), American musician, singer and songwriter (Stone Temple Pilots, Velvet Revolver and Art of Anarchy)
 28
 Guru Josh (51), acid house DJ
 Ian "Lemmy" Kilmister (70), English musician, singer and songwriter (Motörhead, Hawkwind, The Rockin' Vickers)
 30 – Zjef Vanuytsel (70), Belgian folk singer. 
 31 – Natalie Cole (65), American singer, songwriter, and actress (congestive heart failure).

See also 

 Once Upon a Time in Shaolin
 Timeline of musical events
 Women in music

References

 
2015-related lists
Music by year